Dänew District   (formerly Galkynyş District) is a district of Lebap Province in Turkmenistan. The administrative center of the district is the town of Dänew. It was recognized as the "best district" in Turkmenistan for the year 2021.

References

Districts of Turkmenistan
Lebap Region